Mark il poliziotto  (internationally released as Mark of the Cop, Blood, Sweat and Fear and Mark the Narc) is an Italian poliziottesco film  directed in 1975 by Stelvio Massi. This film obtained a great commercial success and generated two sequels, Mark il poliziotto spara per primo and Mark colpisce ancora. The film represents the breakout for the lead actor, Franco Gasparri, who was already a star of Italian fotoromanzi.

Cast 
 Franco Gasparri as Inspector Mark Terzi 
 Lee J. Cobb as Lawyer Benzi 
 Giorgio Albertazzi as  Quaestor  
 Sara Sperati as Irene 
 Carlo Duran as Gruber
 Giampiero Albertini as  Brigadiere Bonetti
 Andrea Aureli as Benzi's Vice 
 Francesco D'Adda as  Investigating judge
 Dada Gallotti as Irene's mother

Release
Mark of the Cop was released in on August 1, 1975 in Italy where it was distributed by Produzioni Atlas Consorziate. It grossed a total of 1,667,090,170 Italian lire on its theatrical release in Italy. The film has been released in the United States as Mark of the Cop and in Europe as Mark the Narc.

References

External links
 

1975 films
1970s Italian-language films
Poliziotteschi films
1970s crime action films
Italian crime action films
Films directed by Stelvio Massi
Films scored by Stelvio Cipriani
1970s Italian films